Sweet Love of Mine is an album by pianist John Hicks, recorded in 2006.

Background
The recording session that produced this album was the last of pianist John Hicks' career.

Recording and music
The album was recorded at the Van Gelder Studio, Englewood Cliffs, New Jersey, on April 5, 2006. "One Peaceful Moment", "Sunset Blues", and "The Things We Did Last Summer" are solo piano performances. "I Guess I'll Hang My Tears Out to Dry" is a duet between Hicks and tenor saxophonist Javon Jackson.

Release
Sweet Love of Mine was released by HighNote Records.

Reception

The Penguin Guide to Jazz commented that "There is an elegiac quality to this set that can't simply be explained by the closeness of Hick's own end, even if he was aware of fading health." AllMusic summarized that "This excellent date is a fitting conclusion to John Hicks' career."

Track listing
"One Peaceful Moment"
"I Guess I'll Hang My Tears Out to Dry"
"Sweet Love of Mine"
"The Things We Did Last Summer"
"Once I Loved"
"Hold It Down"
"Mambo Influenciado"
"I Remember Clifford"
"Peanut Butter Two"
"Sunset Blues"

Personnel 
 John Hicks – piano
 Javon Jackson – tenor sax (tracks 2, 3, 5–9)
 Elise Wood – flute (tracks 3, 7–9)
 Curtis Lundy – bass (tracks 3, 5–9)
 Victor Jones – drums (tracks 3, 5–9)
 Ray Mantilla – percussion (tracks 3, 5, 7, 9)

References 

John Hicks (jazz pianist) albums
2006 albums
HighNote Records albums
Albums recorded at Van Gelder Studio